Tamer Tahoun (born 1 January 1977, Cairo) is an Egyptian foil fencer and one of the head coaches at Star Fencing Academy near Boston, MA.

He was the Egyptian Senior National Champion for 10 years from 1999 to 2008, 5 times African individual gold medalist champion (years 1999, 2000, 2001, 2004 and 2006) and participated in the Junior and Senior World Championships as well as in two Olympic Games (Sydney 2000, Athens 2004). He finished 15th in the 2004 Summer Olympics in Athens. He competed in Junior and Senior World Cups, and reached his highest rank in top 16 of the FIE Ranking in 2004 -2005.

Tamer trained under coaches Hossam Hassan, El Motawakel and Mauro Hamza until 2004.

In 2007 he was black-carded at the All African Games in Algiers when he disputing a referee's ruling in the men's fencing group final, smashed a chair, became foul-mouthed, and the Egyptian fencers attempted to assault the referee before their coaches pushed them away.

Tamer Received his coaching diploma from the General Syndicate of Professions Sports Cairo, Egypt. He worked as the Egyptian National foil team coach for the senior, junior and cadet teams (men and women) from January 2009 until September 2011, He was coaching the Egyptian youth olympic team at the youth Olympic games Singapore 2010, also he was the Fencing Head Coach and Technical Director at El Gezira sporting Club in Cairo from 2008 to 2011, he worked for a period of time with the Italian Maistro Andrea Borella and he got the title of Prévôt De fleuret (Provost of foil) from the US fencing coaching association.  He is an FIE International referee in the disciplines of foil and epee.

References

External links
 
 

1977 births
Living people
Egyptian male foil fencers
Olympic fencers of Egypt
Fencers at the 2000 Summer Olympics
Fencers at the 2004 Summer Olympics